Birchwood Lakes is a census-designated place located in Delaware Township, Pike County in the state of Pennsylvania.  The community is located off Pennsylvania Route 739 in eastern Pike County, near the New Jersey line.  As of the 2010 census the population was 1,386 residents.

Demographics

References

Census-designated places in Pike County, Pennsylvania
Census-designated places in Pennsylvania